C. terrestris may refer to:
 Callitriche terrestris, a plant species
 Chiropterotriton terrestris, a salamander species
 Clubiona terrestris, a sac spider species found in Europe
 Coelotes terrestris, a tangled nest spider species in the genus Coelotes

See also
 Terrestris